Aleksandr Vasilyevich Belenov (born 13 September 1986) is a Russian professional footballer who plays as a goalkeeper for Rubin Kazan.

Career

FC Salyut Belgorod

He made his professional debut in the Russian Second Division in 2004 for FC Salyut-Energia Belgorod. There he played for seven years.

FC Spartak Moscow

In 2010, he joined FC Spartak Moscow. Due to little playing time he chose to leave the team in 2011.

FC Kuban Krasnodar

He joined FC Kuban Krasnodar for €350k. He quickly established himself as #1 goalkeeper.

International
He was called up to the Russian national football team for the first time for a friendly game against the United States on 15 November 2012.

Individual honours
 List of 33 top players of the Russian league: #3 (2013/14).

Career statistics

Club

References

External links
 

1986 births
People from Belgorod
Sportspeople from Belgorod Oblast
Living people
Russian footballers
Russia youth international footballers
Russia national football B team footballers
Association football goalkeepers
FC Salyut Belgorod players
FC Spartak Moscow players
FC Kuban Krasnodar players
FC Anzhi Makhachkala players
FC Ufa players
FC Rubin Kazan players
Russian Premier League players
Russian First League players
Russian Second League players